Alfonso Valdivieso Sarmiento (born 2 October 1949) is a Colombian lawyer and politician.

Biography
Alfonso Sarmiento was born in Bucaramanga, Santander to Roberto Valdivieso Serrano and Mercedes Sarmiento Suárez. He attended Divino Niño school and San Pedro Claver school. After graduating from Instituto Tecnológico Santandereano, he moved to Bogotá. He attended Pontifical Xavierian University where he graduated in Law with a concentration in Socio-Political Sciences. Afterwards he moved to the United States where he received a Master of Arts in Global Development Economics (MA GDE) from Boston University, and advanced studies in Urban and Regional Development at Toronto University.

He is the cousin of the late Luis Carlos Galán, who was assassinated when he was 39 years old.

Political and diplomatic career
As the 2nd Attorney General of Colombia, he brought charges and stood against the administration of Ernesto Samper Pizano during the Proceso 8000. He served as the 24th Permanent Representative of Colombia to the United Nations and as Ambassador of Colombia to Israel. A Radical Change party politician, he was elected Representative and Senator in the Congress of Colombia, and served as Minister of National Education under the administration of Virgilio Barco Vargas.

References

Further reading
 

1949 births
Living people
People from Bucaramanga
Pontifical Xavierian University alumni
Boston University alumni
Academic staff of the Autonomous University of Bucaramanga
Academic staff of the Pontifical Xavierian University
20th-century Colombian lawyers
Colombian economists
Radical Change politicians
Attorneys General of Colombia
Ambassadors of Colombia to Israel
Colombian Ministers of National Education
Members of the Chamber of Representatives of Colombia
Members of the Senate of Colombia
Permanent Representatives of Colombia to the United Nations